Raja Harpal is a small village located in the Sialkot District of the Punjab province in Pakistan. It is situated near the city of Daska and is about 20 kilometers from Sialkot. The village has a population of around 4,000 people, and most of the residents are farmers and laborers.

The village is named after Raja Harpal, a local ruler who is said to have founded the settlement many centuries ago. The village has a rich history and is known for its ancient ruins, including the remains of an old fort and a mosque.

The people of Raja Harpal are known for their hospitality and traditional values. They are mostly Muslims and observe Islamic traditions and customs. The village has a small bazaar where local residents can buy basic necessities, and there are also a few small shops selling local handicrafts and agricultural produce.

Like many other villages in Pakistan, Raja Harpal faces challenges related to poverty, illiteracy, and lack of basic facilities such as clean water, electricity, and healthcare. However, efforts are being made by the government and non-governmental organizations to improve the living standards of the residents of the village.

Villages in Sialkot District